Alistair William Price (born 12 May 1993) is a Scotland international rugby union player who plays as a scrum-half for Glasgow Warriors.

Early life and education

Price was born on 12 May 1993 in King's Lynn, Norfolk, England. He was educated at Wisbech Grammar School, a private school in Wisbech, Cambridgeshire. He is eligible to play for Scotland through his Scottish mother. Price has extended family in Troon, South Ayrshire.

Amateur career

Price was drafted to Ayr in the Scottish Premiership for the 2017-18 season.

Professional career

Price signed for Glasgow Warriors in the 2013–14 season as part of their Elite Development Programme. As part of this deal, Price also plays for the BT Premiership side Stirling County.

On 21 December 2015 Price graduated from the Scottish Rugby Academy and signed professional contract with Glasgow Warriors.

Price's nickname amongst his team mates at Glasgow is "Ah-ha-li Price" in reference to another famous Norfolk resident, Alan Partridge.

International career

On 26 November 2016, Price made his Scotland debut against Georgia in a 43 points to 16 win at Rugby Park, Kilmarnock.

Price was selected in Scotland's 2019 Rugby World Cup squad and played in Scotland's opening Pool A match against Ireland. However he sustained a foot injury and that curtailed his World Cup experience.

Price was capped by Scotland 'A' on 25 June 2022 in their match against Chile.

British & Irish Lions
In May 2021, Price was selected in the 37-man squad for the British and Irish Lions tour of South Africa. He became Lion #843 after taking to the field in the opening warmup match against Japan at Murrayfield.

Price scored a try on his first Lions start against the Sigma Lions at Ellis Park Stadium in Johannesburg.

After performing strongly in the tour's warm-up matches, and despite Conor Murray having previously been named tour captain, Price was selected in the starting line up for the first Test, playing for 65 minutes as the Lions won 22-17 to take a lead in the series. He then came off the bench for another cap in the second Test defeat, before being restored to the starting line-up for the third and decisive Test.

International statistics

References

External links
 

1993 births
Living people
Ayr RFC players
Bedford Blues players
Glasgow Warriors players
People educated at Wisbech Grammar School
Rugby union players from King's Lynn
Scotland international rugby union players
Scottish rugby union players
Stirling County RFC players
Rugby union scrum-halves
British & Irish Lions rugby union players from England
British & Irish Lions rugby union players from Scotland
English people of Scottish descent
Scotland 'A' international rugby union players